Goodlake is a surname

People with this surname include:

 Emilia Jane Goodlake Webb (19th century), mother of ethnographer Augusta Zelia Fraser, sister of General Gerald Goodlake VC, wife of William Frederick Webb
 Lieutenant-General Gerald Goodlake VC (1832–1890), Crimean War veteran
 Olivia Elizabeth Goodlake (19th century), mother of Guy de Lasteyrie, 5th Marquis de Lasteyrie du Saillant
 Thomas Goodlake (14th century), Member of Parliament for Middlesex (UK Parliament constituency) in 1397
 Thomas Mills Goodlake (19th century), father of General Gerald Goodlake VC, grandfather of Augusta Zelia Fraser, father-in-law of William Frederick Webb

See also

 Goodlake Arms, East Challow, Vale of White Horse, Oxfordshire, England, UK; a public house (pub)
 Good Lake, Saskatchewan, Canada; a municipality
 Good (disambiguation)
 Lake (disambiguation)